El Elegante (Spanish for elegant one) is a maar (a type of volcanic crater) located in the Gran Desierto de Altar in the Sonoran Desert, Mexico.

Formation 
The crater was formed about 32,000 years ago when groundwater seeping down into the earth came into contact with magma rising from beneath the crust. The hot magma instantly turned the water to steam, and the sudden high pressure triggered a phreato-magmatic explosion, blowing a huge hole in the ground, and blasting out rocks, magmatic material and ash, forming the crater. The crater rim is higher than the surrounding desert and shows layers of rock built up from the ejecta.

El Elegante contained a lake during the pluvial period preceding the last altithermal period.

Biosphere Reserve 
The crater is located in an important area and nature reserve called El Pinacate y Gran Desierto de Altar Biosphere Reserve, which was declared a World Heritage Site by UNESCO in 2012. It functions as a natural park; El Elegante is the crater most visited by tourists.

References 

Volcanic landforms
Maars of Mexico
Sonoran Desert
Geography of Sonora
Volcanoes of Sonora